Doubletop Mountain may refer to:

Doubletop Mountain (Maine)
Doubletop Mountain (New York)